The canton of Coulommiers is a French administrative division, located in the arrondissement of Meaux, in the Seine-et-Marne département (Île-de-France région).

Demographics

Composition 
At the French canton reorganisation which came into effect in March 2015, the canton was expanded from 15 to 50 communes:

Amillis
Aulnoy
Beautheil-Saints
Bellot
Boissy-le-Châtel
Boitron
La Celle-sur-Morin
Chailly-en-Brie
La Chapelle-Moutils
Chartronges
Chauffry
Chevru
Choisy-en-Brie
Coulommiers
Dagny
Doue
La Ferté-Gaucher
Giremoutiers
Hautefeuille
Hondevilliers
Jouy-sur-Morin
Lescherolles
Leudon-en-Brie
Maisoncelles-en-Brie
Marolles-en-Brie
Mauperthuis
Meilleray
Montdauphin
Montenils
Montolivet
Mouroux
Orly-sur-Morin
Pézarches
Rebais
Sablonnières
Saint-Augustin
Saint-Barthélemy
Saint-Cyr-sur-Morin
Saint-Denis-lès-Rebais
Saint-Germain-sous-Doue
Saint-Léger
Saint-Mars-Vieux-Maisons
Saint-Martin-des-Champs
Saint-Ouen-sur-Morin
Saint-Rémy-la-Vanne
Saint-Siméon
Touquin
La Trétoire
Verdelot
Villeneuve-sur-Bellot

See also
Cantons of the Seine-et-Marne department
Communes of the Seine-et-Marne department

References

Coulommiers